Preston Young (born July 14, 1954) was a football player in the CFL for eight years. Preston played defensive back for the Saskatchewan Roughriders, Toronto Argonauts, Hamilton Tiger-Cats and Montreal Concordes from 1978 to 1985. He played college football at Simon Fraser University.

References

1954 births
Canadian football defensive backs
Hamilton Tiger-Cats players
Living people
Montreal Concordes players
Players of Canadian football from Saskatchewan
Simon Fraser Clan football players
Saskatchewan Roughriders players
Sportspeople from Regina, Saskatchewan
Toronto Argonauts players